Trichaeta parva is a moth in the subfamily Arctiinae. It was described by Per Olof Christopher Aurivillius in 1910 and is found in Guinea-Bissau.

References

Arctiidae genus list at Butterflies and Moths of the World of the Natural History Museum

Moths described in 1910
Arctiinae